Memoirs of a Spacewoman is a science fiction novel by Naomi Mitchison, already a noted novelist and poet and sister of the famous biologist J.B.S. Haldane. It was first published in 1962 by Victor Gollancz Ltd.

Plot summary
The aforementioned Spacewoman in question is a scientist and explorer. At this point, humans have explored many worlds in a number of different galaxies. Their quest is for knowledge and to be helpful to whom they encounter, but there is a strict rule against 'interference'. It is assumed to be in the far future, but no dates are ever given and it's mentioned that time works differently on different planets. The story is a retelling of the narrator’s experience training and career as a space explorer.

The narrator, Mary, is a specialist in 'communication' - a kind of telepathy that allows her to communicate with nearly every species she comes across in her exploration. She operates in a society where women are just as likely as men to be leaders, though she herself prefers not to lead. She operates in a more utopian society where leadership is not gender-specific, but Mary does make it clear that she does not want to lead herself. Their society is also one that does not engage with the same rules of sexual expression that we do. Mary is aware of her female sexuality and is free to enjoy it as she pleases. This results in her having multiple children. Four of her children are described as “normal” as they were conceived just as any other child. Viola, however, was conceived after her ovaries were stimulated through her interaction with a martian, resulting in a haploid child, who was healthy nonetheless.

Major themes
There are no space-opera thrills and fights: rather there are a number of different worlds with interesting biologies. The expansive worlds that the book explores allow for the discussion of a number of different important ethical issues.  One of these discussions focuses on the ethical treatment of animals. The story exemplifies situations where animals were treated as “intellectual equals, or, in certain subjects, superiors”. These actions were taken as an end in themselves, not a method of forming a greater relationship with other humans. This take on sympathy and empathetic treatment towards animals likely stems from Mitchison’s view on the treatment of colonized people of the time. Throughout her life, Mitchinson had seen the formation and independence of a number of different colonies, including India (1947) and South Africa (1961) which both featured very popular independence movements.

Publication history
 1962, Great Britain, Victor Gollancz Ltd, hardcover 
 January 1964, Great Britain, Four Square Books, paperback 
 June 1973, United States, Berkley Medallion, paperback 
 1976, Great Britain, New English Library, hardcover
 April 1977, Great Britain, New English Library Master SF series, paperback, with introduction by Hilary Rubinstein
 July 1985, Great Britain, The Women's Press, paperback 
 February 2011, Great Britain, Kennedy & Boyd, paperback

References

External links
 Short excerpt
 Review with brief summary
 
  The Naomi Mitchison Library Series

1962 British novels
1962 science fiction novels
British science fiction novels
Feminist science fiction novels
Victor Gollancz Ltd books